Albert Ferdinand Adolf Karl Friedrich von Bonin (11 November 1803 in Heeren, Altmark – 16 April 1872 in Berlin) was a corps commander of the Prussian Army at the Battle of Trautenau in 1866, and a colleague of Karl Friedrich von Steinmetz. He made his military career from Oberst (1851), Major general (1854) to Lieutenant general and adjutant of the king (1858). In 1863 he became Kommanierender General and 1864 General of the Infantry.

During the Austro-Prussian War he commanded I Corps. He was beaten back at Trautenau, before participating in the Battle of Königgrätz.

Honours and awards
 : Grand Cordon of the Order of Leopold (military), 27 January 1861

References

 Spehr, Ludwig Ferdinand: "Bonin, Adolf von", Allgemeine Deutsche Biographie Band 3, Duncker & Humblot, Leipzig 1876, p. 128.

Generals of Infantry (Prussia)
1803 births
1872 deaths
People from Stendal
People from the Province of Saxony
Prussian people of the Austro-Prussian War
Knights Grand Cross of the Order of Saints Maurice and Lazarus
Recipients of the Order of the White Eagle (Russia)
Recipients of the Order of St. Vladimir, 3rd class
Recipients of the Order of St. Anna, 1st class
Recipients of the Order of Saint Stanislaus (Russian), 1st class
Knights of the Order of the Dannebrog
Military personnel from Saxony-Anhalt